The Giustiniani Portrait or Portrait of a Young Man is a painting of about 1503-1504 frequently, but not universally, attributed to Giorgione, which is now in the Gemäldegalerie, Berlin.

Bibliography
Alessandra Fregolent, Giorgione, Electa, Milano 2001. 

1504 paintings
Paintings by Giorgione
16th-century portraits
Paintings in the Gemäldegalerie, Berlin
Portraits of men
Portraits by Italian artists